On 8 January 2016, two suspected militants, armed with a melee weapon and a signal flare, allegedly arrived by sea and stormed the Bella Vista Hotel in the Red Sea city of Hurghada, Egypt, stabbing two foreign tourists from Austria and one from Sweden. (Early reports incorrectly stated that the victims were one German and one Danish national.) One of the attackers, 21-year-old student Mohammed Hassan Mohammed Mahfouz, was killed by police as he tried to take a woman hostage. The other attacker was injured. The Islamic State of Iraq and the Levant claimed responsibility.

Attack
An Egyptian court found that the attack was incited by a Syria-based operative of the Islamic State who was in contact with the perpetrators.

According to The Independent, both attackers carried knives and pellet guns. According to Al Jazeera, they carried "a gun, a knife and a suicide belt."

All roads into and out of Hurghada were closed as Egyptian security searched for additional attackers. According to BBC security analyst Frank Gardner, the ISIS goal in inciting such attacks is to undermine crucial support tourism provides to the Egyptian economy.

Assailants
There were two attackers, Mohamad Hassan Mohamed Mahfouz and Mohamed Magdy Abul Kheir. Mahfouz was shot dead at the scene; Kheir was wounded. Kheir was charged with possessing ammunition and firearms, joining an illegal group, and attempted murder. He was given a life sentence.

An operative of the Islamic State, Ahmad Abdel Salam Mansour, an Egyptian national operating out of Syrian, was tried in absentia by an Egyptian court on charges of having incited the two attackers. He was sentenced in absentia to life in prison.

Response
Hisham Zaazou, Egypt's Minister of Tourism, responded by announcing new security measures to protect tourists.

The attack was one of 78 described by Donald Trump as underreported terrorist attacks.

Impact
Egypt, which is a country that depends on tourism saw tourism nosedive during the revolution. Once the country's government began to stabilize and tourism began picking up, terrorists began targeting tourism sites.
Due to this and other attacks, 2016 was a "tough year" for the tourism industry in Egypt.

See also

2017 Hurghada attack
Terrorism in Egypt
List of terrorist incidents, January–June 2016
Timeline of the Sinai insurgency

References

Attacks on hotels in Africa
Attacks on tourists
Hurghada
ISIL terrorist incidents in Egypt
Islamic terrorist incidents in 2016
January 2016 crimes in Africa
January 2016 events in Africa
Red Sea Governorate
Sinai insurgency
Terrorist incidents in Egypt in 2016
Terrorist incidents involving knife attacks